"Naked" is a song by American recording artist and record producer Kevin McCall featuring rapper Big Sean. The song was released as a single on May 4, 2012. The song peaked 77 on the Billboard Hot R&B/Hip-Hop Songs.

Background

Talking about the song in an interview, McCall explained: "There was a young producer/songwriter named David Wade, he came on the record and by the time the hook came in, I was like “this is nice.” It kind of reminds me of "SexyBack" by Justin Timberlake. I just felt like it was really young and fresh and something different than what everybody else was doing. So, I had to go in on it and put my little twist on it. It came out great. We went and got Big Sean, that took it to the next level. Shout out to Big Sean for blessing me with that verse."

Music video
The music video for "Naked" was directed by Chris Brown and Godfrey Tabarez and filmed in Los Angeles, California in April 2012. It was premiered on May 22, 2012.

Track list

Digital single

Chart performance

References

2012 singles
2012 songs
Kevin McCall songs
Big Sean songs
RCA Records singles
Songs written by Big Sean
Songs written by Kevin McCall